Ankyrin repeat and kinase domain containing 1 (ANKK1) also known as protein kinase PKK2 or sugen kinase 288 (SgK288) is an enzyme that in humans is encoded by the ANKK1 gene.  The ANKK1 is a member of an extensive family of the Ser/Thr protein kinase family, and protein kinase superfamily  involved in signal transduction pathways.

Clinical significance 

This gene contains a single nucleotide polymorphism that causes an amino acid substitution within the 11th of 12 ankyrin repeats of ANKK1 (Glu713Lys of 765 residues). This polymorphism, which is commonly referred to Taq1A, was previously believed to be located in the promoter region of the DRD2 gene, since the polymorphism is proximal to the DRD2 gene and can influence DRD2 receptor expression. It is now known to be located in the coding region of the ANKK1 gene which controls the synthesis of dopamine in the brain. The A1 allele is associated with increased activity of striatal L-amino acid decarboxylase.

A1+ allele 

 Hepatitis C infection
 Antisocial personality disorder
 Borderline personality traits
 Schizoid/avoidant behavior

Given that the A1+ allele is associated with antisocial personality disorder, one may infer that the allele is also associated with narcissistic personality disorder and histrionic personality disorder. However, these predictions have not yet been empirically verified.

A1+ genotype frequencies 

European population estimates for A1+ genotype frequencies range from 20.8 to 43.4% (National Center of Biotechnology Information (NCBI), identification number rs1800497).

Addictive behaviors 

The ANKK1 gene is closely linked to dopamine receptor D2 (DRD2) on chromosome band 11q23.1. The A1 allele of the Taq1A polymorphism (rs1800497T), is located ≈10kb downstream of the dopamine receptor DRD2 gene. Dopamine (DA) is a neurotransmitter in the brain, which controls feelings of wellbeing. This sensation results from the interaction of dopamine and other neurotransmitters such as serotonin, the opioids, and other brain chemicals. Dopamine increases the motivation for food cravings and appetite mediation.

The Reward Deficiency Syndrome (RDS) involves the pleasures or reward mechanisms that rely on dopamine. The result of this deficiency is based on the genetic makeup; this helps explain how certain simple genetic anomalies can give rise to complex aberrant behaviours as the ones mentioned previously. The A1 allelic prevalence has been reported to be significantly higher in obese individuals than in lean subjects, moreover, individuals with increased body mass index (BMI) (BMI ≥ 30 kg/m2) have fewer DRD2 dopamine receptors. Investigators have also suggested that hormonal mechanism may underline a gender difference in the ability to suppress hunger in relation to this SNP, which may contribute to the greater incidence of obesity in women compared to men. However, authors have pointed out that A1 carriers have difficulty in learning from negative feedback in a reinforcement-learning task and are less efficient at learning to avoid actions that have negative consequences.

References

External links 

For more related information on the SNP:  SNPedia
Dopamine receptor D2; DRD2: OMNI Entry
The Human Gene Compendium DRD2: GeneCards
 

Signal transduction
Protein kinases